Petra Herzigová (born 29 January 1986) is a Czech ice hockey and ball hockey player, currently playing with the women's representative ice hockey team of HC Příbram in the Czech Women's Ice Hockey Extraliga and with the ball hockey team SHM HK Avir Praha in the Czech Women's Ball Hockey Extraliga. She is the general manager of the Czech women's national under-16 ice hockey team.

Ice hockey career 
Herzigová's ice hockey club career has been played with HC Příbram and HC Slavia Praha of the Czech Women's Extraliga, HPK Kiekkonaiset of the Naisten SM-sarja, Sundsvall/Timrå and SDE Hockey of the Swedish Women's Hockey League (SDHL), and HC Université Neuchâtel of the Swiss Women's Hockey League A (SWHL A).

Ball hockey career 
Herzigová has participated in several ISBHF World Women Street & Ball Hockey Championships, winning bronze medals with the Czech women's national ball hockey team in 2011 and 2019, and a gold medal in 2017. She was named to the tournament All-Star Team at the 2011 World Championship.

References

External links

1986 births
Living people
Ball hockey players
Czech expatriate ice hockey players in Finland
Czech expatriate ice hockey players in Sweden
Czech expatriate ice hockey players in Switzerland
Czech women's ice hockey defencemen
HPK Kiekkonaiset players
People from Znojmo
SDE Hockey players
Sportspeople from the South Moravian Region